Little Bird Bistro was a French bistro in Portland, Oregon, in the United States. The restaurant opened in 2010, and closed on October 27, 2019.

Description and history
Little Bird was a French bistro in downtown Portland. It opened in 2010, and has been called Le Pigeon's "downtown sister". The Oregonian Michael Russell described the restaurant as a "Swiss Army knife, stately enough for a business lunch, lively enough for an anniversary dinner, yet able to handle a drop-in at 10:45 p.m." The dining room was designed by Mark Annen, and featured robin egg blue walls, tall mirrors, and taxidermied birds.

In 2015, Gabriel Rucker replaced opening chef Erik Van Kley. Rucker's team of chefs included Marcelle Crooks, Andrew Gordon, and Su Lien Pino. As of 2015, Kristen Thoennes served as general manager and Andy Fortgang is Little Bird's wine director.

The restaurant closed on October 27, 2019.

Reception
In 2012, Little Bird was The Oregonian selection for "Restaurant of the Year". In 2016, the newspaper ranked Little Bird number 16 on its list of "Portland's 101 best restaurants". The Oregonian Michael Russell included Little Bird is his list of "Portland's most painful restaurant closures of 2019".

See also

 List of defunct restaurants of the United States
 List of French restaurants

References

External links
 
 
 

2010 establishments in Oregon
2019 disestablishments in Oregon
Defunct French restaurants in Portland, Oregon
Restaurants disestablished in 2019
Restaurants established in 2010
Southwest Portland, Oregon